Svanholm is a country estate and former manor  west of Copenhagen, Denmark. In 1978 an association of over 100 persons bought the estate to create Denmark's largest intentional community. The Svanholm collective grows its own food and was one of the pioneers of organic farming in Denmark.

The name comes from svan meaning "swan" and holm meaning "islet"; ie. Svanholm means "Swan-isle".

Geography
The Svanholm estate is place within the north regions of the village of Skibby in Krogstrup parish, on the Hornsherred peninsula between Roskilde Fjord and Ise Fjord on the north coast of Zealand. It consists of a main building (the former manor house) plus 12 other dwellings and utility buildings nearby or elsewhere on the grounds.

History
The earliest mention of Svanholm in historical documents is in 1346. Its owner at the time was the knight Niels Knudsen Manderup. The building was completely renovated and extended in 1744.

Open to visitors
The community offers guided tours throughout the year on Sundays from 11 a.m. or upon request

See also
 Twin Oaks Community, Virginia

References

External links 
 
 The Svanholm Collective's website in English
 Intentional Communities directory entry

Houses in Frederikssund Municipality
Utopian communities
Rural community development
Ecovillages
Houses completed in 1744
Listed castles and manor houses in Denmark
Listed buildings and structures in Frederikssund Municipality
1744 establishments in Denmark